This is a list of South Korean films that received a domestic theatrical release in 2011.

Box office
The highest-grossing South Korean films released in 2011, by domestic box office gross revenue, are as follows:

Released

See also 
 2011 in South Korea
 2011 in South Korean music
 List of 2011 box office number-one films in South Korea

References

External links 
 2011 in South Korea

 Korean Film Council website
 Hancinema

2011
Film
South Korean